Casanova Cat is a 1951 one-reel animated cartoon and is the 55th Tom and Jerry short directed by William Hanna and Joseph Barbera and produced by Fred Quimby.

Plot
Tom heads to Toodles' home to woo her with flowers upon learning that she has recently inherited $1,000,000, dragging Jerry, tied to a bow, with him. Once inside, Tom winds Jerry into a doll and forces him to roll on a ball, impressing Toodles. Tom then blackens Jerry's face with cigar smoke and blowing it. He forces Jerry to tap-dance by lighting up a metal plate. Tom then gives Jerry as a present to Toodles, but asks for a kiss in return. Just as Tom and Toodles are about to kiss, Jerry jams Tom's tail into an automatic ashtray, causing Tom to scream in Toodles' face.

Jerry escapes to the window ledge and spots Butch singing a couple of lines from "Over the Rainbow" (his singing was provided by Jerry Mann) in a nearby alley and launches the newspaper headline towards Butch. Tom and Butch proceed to fight each other to win Toodles' heart, while Toodles, sitting on the couch, watches them. Butch slaps Tom (because he slapped him with his glove) into a fishbowl, but Tom ties Butch's tail to a pole. Toodles then tosses sweets into Tom's mouth, but Butch drops a bowling ball into Tom. Butch kisses Toodles' arm, but Tom places a mousetrap onto her arm to trap Butch's kissing mouth. Tom then traps Butch between two doors and kisses Toodles' cheek. Butch then grabs Toodles and goes to kiss her, but Tom also turns around to also kiss Toodles, but the two kiss each other instead and Tom turns around and attacks Butch in the face.

Jerry then kisses Toodles on the cheek, causing her to take an interest in Jerry. Tom and Butch chase Jerry, but Jerry hides in a vent, ties Butch and Tom's tails into a knot, and pull their tails to make them pull each other into the wall repeatedly. Butch then runs forward, squeezing Tom through the vent. Tom then pops out of the vent as a cube and bangs into Butch. Then they untangle themselves. Afterwards, they looked on the couch for Toodles and search for her. However, they then hear a noise outside. Both cats ran to the window to look at what is happening and see a car leaving. Toodles and Jerry are in the back seat, then after Jerry has put down the shade in the car, he and Toodles share a love-kiss.

Production
 Directed by William Hanna and Joseph Barbera
 Animation: Irven Spence, Ray Patterson, Ed Barge, Kenneth Muse
 Story: William Hanna and Joseph Barbera
 Layout: Dick Bickenbach
 Music: Scott Bradley
 Produced by: Fred Quimby

Availability
VHS
Tom and Jerry's Cartoon Cavalcade (uncensored)
DVD
Tom and Jerry: The Classic Collection (Region 2 DVD, uncensored)
This cartoon was omitted from the Spotlight Collection, Volume 3 DVD release in 2007. It had been announced that Casanova Cat would be available on the Tom and Jerry Golden Collection - Volume 2 on DVD and Blu-ray, with the short being presented uncut, uncensored, and restored. However, on February 6, 2013, it was announced by  TVShowsOnDVD.com that Casanova Cat was not part of the list of cartoons on this release, as well as the cartoon Mouse Cleaning, which was also skipped over on the Spotlight Collection, Volume 3 DVD release. Furthermore, the set was indefinitely delayed following a negative reception.

Censorship and bans
Because of the cartoon involving Jerry's blackface dance scene from Tom's cigar smoke on a hot plate, this short like Mouse Cleaning was banned from being released on DVD in the United States by Warner Home Video, as well as the Tom and Jerry Golden Collection: Volume 2, this short was not aired on Cartoon Network or Boomerang because of racial stereotyping of African Americans. The episode did, however, air on May 1, 2021 on METV with the censored Turner print, cutting out the blackface.

References

External links

1951 short films
1951 animated films
1951 films
Tom and Jerry short films
Short films directed by Joseph Barbera
Short films directed by William Hanna
1950s American animated films
1950s animated short films
1951 comedy films
Films scored by Scott Bradley
Metro-Goldwyn-Mayer animated short films
Animated films without speech
Metro-Goldwyn-Mayer short films
American romantic comedy films
Films produced by Fred Quimby
Metro-Goldwyn-Mayer cartoon studio short films
Film controversies
African-American-related controversies in film
Race-related controversies in animation
Race-related controversies in film